The Michigan Secretary of State election of 2018 took place on November 6, 2018, alongside Michigan's governor, Class I United States Senator, Attorney General, as well elections for Michigan's 14 seats in the United States House of Representatives, all 38 seats in the Michigan Senate and all 110 seats in the Michigan House of Representatives; to elect the Secretary of State of Michigan. Incumbent Republican Secretary of State Ruth Johnson could not seek a third term due to term limits. The Michigan Republican Party was looking to win its 7th straight Secretary of State election. Along with the offices of Lieutenant Governor and Attorney General, the nominees for Secretary of State were chosen by party delegates at their respective party conventions.

On November 6, 2018, Benson defeated Lang by an 8.9% margin.

Republican Party

Candidates

Nominee
 Mary Treder Lang, Vice Chairwoman of the Eastern Michigan University Board of Regents

Declared
 Stan Grot, Shelby Township Clerk
 Joseph Guzman

Withdrew
 Mike Kowall, state Senator

Endorsements

Democratic Party

Candidates

Nominee
 Jocelyn Benson, Former Dean of Wayne State University Law School and nominee for Secretary of State in 2010

Declined
 Barbara Byrum, Ingham County Clerk

Endorsements

Minor parties

Libertarian Party
 Gregory Stempfle

General election

Predictions

Polling

Fundraising

Results

Notes

References

External links
Official campaign websites
Jocelyn Benson (D) for Secretary of State
Mary Treder Lang (R) for Secretary of State
Gregory Stempfle (L) for Secretary of State

secretary of state
Michigan Secretary of State elections
November 2018 events in the United States
Michigan